Where Can You Go Without the Little Vice? is a 1979 Italian commedia sexy all'italiana film directed by Marino Girolami (under the pseudonym "Franco Martinelli").

Cast 

Renzo Montagnani: Diogene Colombo
Alvaro Vitali: Aroldo / Carlotta / Gigetto
Paola Senatore: Miss Beltramelli
Mario Carotenuto: Mr. Beltramelli
Stefano Amato: Beniamino Colombo
Lory Del Santo: Irma 
Sabrina Siani: Mrs. Francesca
Angie Vibeker: Emma
Franco Caracciolo: un travestito

Plot
A private investigator is hired by a seductive woman, who undertakes to find out if there are other women in the life of her husband, a wealthy and powerful businessman. To avoid arousing the suspicions of her husband, the detective and his assistant are forced to pass himself off, respectively, for the butler homosexual Diogenes and for Carlotta cook and, with the complicity of his wife, they are taken inside the house, along the rest of the servants. But the task is quite difficult for the two investigators, one dealing with three women that they assiduously court, and the other with an abusive gardener sex maniac. During a shadowing of her husband, the two detectives discover that this is actually a homosexual who likes to wear women's clothes, and has a relationship with a transvestite, a former boxer middleweight champion Lazio. Accordatisi with her husband for a double-digit compared to the promise from the lady, the two pretend not to have seen anything, so as to receive double compensation by both spouses. Completed the task, the two returned home, giving a lift to two Finnish women, which are actually two men who rob them of all the money and car.

References

External links

Where Can You Go Without the Little Vice? at Variety Distribution

1970s sex comedy films
Films directed by Marino Girolami
Commedia sexy all'italiana
Italian LGBT-related films
Films scored by Berto Pisano
1979 comedy films
1979 films
1970s Italian films